Pir Qasem (also Romanized as Pīr Qāsem) is a village in Dinavar Rural District, Dinavar District, Sahneh County, Kermanshah Province, Iran. At the 2006 census, its population was 24, in 6 families.

References 

Populated places in Sahneh County